The naiskos (pl.: naiskoi; , diminutive of ναός "temple")  is a small temple in classical order with columns or pillars and pediment.

Ancient Greece
Often applied as an artificial motif, it is common in ancient art. It also found in the funeral architecture of the ancient Attic cemeteries as grave reliefs or shrines with statues  for example the stele of Aristonautes from Kerameikos in Athens and in the black-figure and red-figure pottery of Ancient Greece at the Loutrophoros and the Lekythos and the red-figure wares of Apulia in South Italy.

Other styles
There also exist naiskos-type figurines or other types of temples formed in terracotta, examples of which abound at the Louvre Museum in Paris. The form of the naiskos suggests a religious context, relating especially to Greek funerary culture. Some of the Hellenistic inscriptions found in the Bay of Grama are placed inside a naiskos, and in this case the religious context is an invocation of Castor and Pollux (Dioskouroi) for a safe passage across the Adriatic, rather than funerary.  

A similar style, called the aedicula, is observed in Roman art.

References

Bibliography
  'Naiskoi für Menschen. Eine heroisierende Fiktion im unteritalischen Vasenbild," in Christine Schmitz, Anja Bettenworth (ed.), Menschen - Heros - Gott: Weltentwürfe und Lebensmodelle im Mythos der Vormoderne (Stuttgart, Franz Steiner Verlag, 2009), 35-52.
 Richard T. Neer, Greek Art and Archaeology: A New History, c. 2500- c.150 BCE (Thames and Hudson, 2012), 301-340.
Arben Hajdari, Joany Reboton, Saïmir Shpuza, Pierre Cabanes, "Les inscriptions de Grammata (Albanie) [article]" (Revue des Études Grecques, 2007, 120-2), 353-394

External links 

Bochum von Johannes Bergemann - Die Datenbank der attischen Grabreliefs

Archaeological features
Ancient Greek sculpture
Greek temples